Rinat Morozov (born  October 24, 1969, in Kharkiv, Ukrainian SSR) is a Ukrainian football manager. He is the current head coach of amateurs FC Arsenal-Politekhnik Kharkiv \amateurs\ in the First League of the Kharkiv Oblast.

Career 
Morozov, after graduating of Kharkiv State Institute of Physical culture and Sport in 1991, he began coaching career. During 2006-2010 he worked in Russian Federation as Director of Sport in FC Gornyak Stroitel in Belgorod Oblast. He spent some years as manager in FC Helios.

References

External links 
Short Info

1969 births
Living people
Footballers from Kharkiv
Soviet footballers
Ukrainian football managers
FC Kharkiv managers
FC Kharkiv-2 managers
FC Helios Kharkiv managers